Jean-Michel Guenassia (born 1950 in Algiers) is a French writer.

His novel Le Club des incorrigibles optimistes won the Prix Goncourt des lycéens in November 2009.

Biography 
A lawyer for six years, Jean-Michel Guenassia lived from his pen by writing screenplays for television.

His publisher Albin Michel nonetheless presented Le Club des incorrigibles optimistes issued in 2009 as the first novel of a 59-year-old unknown.

In 2012, he published a second novel, La Vie rêvée d'Ernesto G.

Works

Le Club des incorrigibles optimistes 
Le Club des incorrigibles optimistes was published in 2009 by Éditions Albin Michel.

In this almost 800-page book, Jean-Michel Guenassia had the ambition to write both the "novel of a generation" by carefully reconstructing the 1960s (the Cold War), the Algerian question, the appearance of rock and roll etc.) and the "melancholic chronicle of an adolescence". The title is justified by the decisive location of the novel, the back room of a Parisian bistro frequented by Joseph Kessel and Jean-Paul Sartre, where there are men who fled Communism of Eastern countries (Igor, former Russian doctor threatened by the Stalinist purges, Pavel former Czech diplomat ...) but who are all "incorrigible optimists".

The novel was hailed by unanimous acclaim (Télérama, Le Point, L'Express, Le Nouvel Observateur...) and found a large audience. It was awarded the Prix Goncourt des lycéens on 9 November 2009 and the 2010 readers Prize of Notre Temps.

Scripts 
 1990: Pour cent millions (TV) by Brigitte Sauriol, série Haute Tension, screenplay by Jean-Michel Guenassia, Michel Bouchard
 1992 : Récidive (TV) by Franck Apprédéris, screenplay by Jean-Michel Guenassia, Bernard-Pierre Donnadieu & Franck Apprédéris

Theatre 

Novels 
 1986: Pour cent millions, Éditions Liana Levi,   (Prix du roman policier francophone de la ville du Mans), reissued under the title Dernière donne by Le Livre de Poche,  in 2014
 2009: , Albin Michel (Prix Goncourt des lycéens), Livre de Poche  
 2012: La Vie rêvée d'Ernesto G, Albin Michel,   
 2015: Trompe-la-mort, Albin Michel, Live de Poche,  
 2016: La Valse des arbres et du ciel, Albin Michel, 
 2017: De l’influence de David Bowie sur la destinée des jeunes filles, Albin Michel
 2021: Les Terres promises, Albin Michel

References

External links 
Jean-Michel Guenassia on Babelio
Auteurs français à découvrir, parfumdelivres.com
Jean-Michel Guenassia avec et sans panache on Libération.fr
Jean-Michel Guenassia - Le Club des Incorrigibles Optimistes on YouTube

Prix Goncourt des lycéens winners
20th-century French novelists
21st-century French novelists
French crime fiction writers
French screenwriters
1950 births
People from Algiers
Living people